Lea Vivot is a Czech-born Canadian sculptor. She has studied at the Ontario College of Art in Toronto, Ontario as well as Prague, Czechoslovakia, Milan, Italy and New York City, United States. Although her main focus is sculpture, Vivot is also active in drawing and printmaking. Vivot’s over life-sized bronze sculptures are figurative and often depict families, couples, mothers, children, and other subjects of humanity. Most of her sculptures include benches, which have become her trademark.

Works by Vivot
 Following the death of New Democratic Party leader Jack Layton, Vivot announced that she would create three different public statues of him, for Toronto, Ottawa, and his hometown of Hudson, Quebec.
 Tommy Douglas (Weyburn, Saskatchewan)
 The Secret Bench of Knowledge (Library and Archives Canada, Ottawa)
 Endless Bench (Located at front of Toronto's Hospital for Sick Children)
 Le banc des amoureux (Montreal Botanical Garden, Montreal)
 Le banc du secret (Le 2001 McGill College, Montreal)
 Joy Of Life (1983):  Montreal 1434 Sherbrooke Ave. West
 Lavička neřesti The Bench of Vice, K Žižkovu 1851/4, Prague

Gallery

References

External links

 Maclean's article about Lea Vivot's proposed Jack layton memorial statues
 Huffington Post Three Jack Layton Statues Planned By Canadian Sculptor
 CBC: Layton's likeness to be cast in bronze
 Kiefer Sutherland unveils Tommy Douglas statue
 CZECH TELEVISION DOCUMENTARY
 leavivot.com/about_the_artist
 Lea Vivot

1954 births
Living people
Canadian sculptors
20th-century sculptors
21st-century Czech sculptors
Czech women sculptors
Czech emigrants to Canada
20th-century Canadian women artists
21st-century Canadian women artists